Ostara is a British folk music group, "described in the musical press as a neo-folk / pop music hybrid", founded by Richard Leviathan (born Richard Levy) and Timothy Jenn, as a change of name and stylistic direction from their previous band, Strength Through Joy. Jenn left the band in 2001. Guitarist Stu Mason, drummer Tim Desmond, and former Bronski Beat/Communards bassist Dave Renwick left the band in 2010, as work was due to start on a new album. Leviathan is now the only member of the band. Finnish musician Kari Hatakka, known as the singer of the band Waltari, played synthesizers on some Ostara tracks.

Discography

Albums
Secret Homeland (2000)
Kingdom Gone (2002)
Ultima Thule (2003)
Immaculate Destruction (2005)
The Only Solace (2009)
Paradise Down South (2014)
Napoleonic Blues (2017)
Eclipse of the West (2020)

EPs
Whispers of the Soul (2001)

References

External links
Official site

British folk music groups
Soleilmoon artists